The following is a list of individuals associated with Hollins University through attending as a student, or serving as a member of the faculty or staff.

Notable alumni

Activism
 Ellen Malcolm, Founder of EMILY's List, 1969
 Emily Wheat Maynard, jewelry designer and founder of Elva Fields Jewelry, 2000

Arts
 Brandy S. Culp, curator of the Historic Charleston Foundation's collection of fine and decorative arts, 1998 
 Haruki Fujimoto, dancer, choreographer, Broadway performer, and teacher at Hollins for 20 years. 
 Gaspard Louis, dancer, choreographer
 Sally Mann, photographer and writer, shortlisted for 2015 National Book Award, 1974, M.A. 1975
 Katy Pyle, dancer and choreographer, artistic director of Ballez, B.A. 2002

Authors 
 Madison Smartt Bell, author of Ten Indians, M.A. 1981
 Jenny Boully, author of five books, professor of creative writing and literature at Bennington College, 1998, M.A. 1999
 Margaret Wise Brown, author of Goodnight Moon, 1932
 Amanda Cockrell, children's book author, 1969, M.A. 1988
 Kiran Desai, author and recipient of the Man Booker Prize in 2006, M.A. 1994
 Tony D'Souza, author of Whiteman, M.A. 1998
 Cathryn Hankla, American poet, 1980, M.A. 1982
 Elizabeth Forsythe Hailey, author of A Woman Of Independent Means, 1960
 Tama Janowitz, American author, M.A. 1979, commonly grouped with 1980s Brat Pack (literary) 
 Jill McCorkle, author, 1981
 Candice F. Ransom, author of children's books
 Ethel Morgan Smith, author of From Whence Cometh My Help: The African American Community at Hollins College, 1999
 Lee Smith, author and winner of many awards including the Southern Book Critics Circle Award and two O. Henry Awards, 1967
 Edna Henry Lee Turpin, American author of children's books, ALND 1887
 Beth Macy, author, whose book Factory Man was a New York Times best seller and optioned by Playtone for an HBO mini series, M.A. 1998
 Sylvia Wilkinson, author, M.A., 1963

Business
 Caroline Hipple, former executive vice president of This End Up and president of Storehouse Furniture, 1977
 Shannon Ravenel, cofounder of Algonquin Books, 1960
 Alexandra Trower, executive vice president of global communications at Estee Lauder, recipient of the International Women's Media Foundation's Corporate Leadership Award, 1986

Government and Public Service
 Jennifer Boysko, member of the Virginia House of Delegates, 2016
 Betsy B. Carr, member of the Virginia House of Delegates, 1968
 Elizabeth Brownlee Kolmstetter, one of the first federal employees tapped to create the Transportation Security Administration (TSA) in the aftermath of 9/11, 1985
 Pamela Jo Howell Slutz, career diplomat and former U.S. Ambassador to Burundi and Mongolia, 1970
 Flo Neher Traywick, first woman in Virginia to be nominated by either party to run for Congress (House of Representatives)-Sixth Congressional District, 1945
 Elizabeth Fentress Goodwin, cofounder, National Down Syndrome Society, 1969

Higher Education
 Linda Koch Lorimer, president, Randolph-Macon Woman’s College; vice president for global and strategic initiatives, Yale University, 1974

Journalism
 Suzanne Allen, Emmy Award-winning senior coordinating producer for CBS' 48 Hours, 1969
 Ann Compton, ABC News White House correspondent, 1969
 M. L. Flynn, senior producer, editorial planning, NBC Nightly News, 1972
 Mary Garber, first woman sportswriter in the Atlantic Coast Conference, 1938
 Ruth Hale, journalist, feminist, and founder of the Lucy Stone League
 M. Carrie Allan, Washington Post columnist, nominated for the James Beard Award in the journalism category for In New Orleans, Terrific Cocktails Never Went out of Fashion, 1998, M.A. 1999
 Elizabeth Valk Long, first woman publisher of Time Inc., 1972

Law
 Tiffany M. Graves, executive director, Mississippi Access to Justice Commission, 1997
 Callie V. Granade, district judge, United States District Court for the Southern District of Alabama, 1972

Media and entertainment

 Jennifer Berman, sexual health expert, urologist, and female sexual medicine specialist
 George Butler, documentary filmmaker and writer, M.A. 1968
 Ellen Goldsmith-Vein, owner and CEO of the Gotham Group, dubbed one of Hollywood's Most Powerful Women, 1984
 Donna Richardson, fitness and aerobics instructor, author and television sports commentator, ALND 1984
 Claire Sanders Swift, Emmy Award-winning broadcast journalist and prominent national media consultant, 1985
 Ellen Stokes, Emmy nominated and CableACE Award winning producer and director, 1972
 Eleanor D. Wilson, actress and Tony Award nominee, 1930
 Danielle D. Rollins, Gracious Living & Stylish Entertaining™ lifestyle expert, author of Soiree: Entertaining with Style, 1990
 Sadie Tillery, director of programming, Full Frame Documentary Film Festival, 2005
 Veronica Votypka, co-executive producer for Harpo Studios/Oprah Winfrey Network, 1999

Pulitzer Prize Winners
 Mary Wells Ashworth, Pulitzer Prize–winning historian, 1924
 Annie Dillard, Pulitzer Prize–winning writer, 1967, M.A. 1968
 Henry S. Taylor, Pulitzer Prize–winning poet, M.A. 1966
 Natasha Trethewey, American poet, winner of the Pulitzer Prize in 2007, United States Poet Laureate, M.A. 1991

Religion
 Lindsey Moser (née Narmour), Jack Kent Cook Scholar, Medieval Literary academic, and the youngest USAF and CAP appointed chaplain in modern history, 2015

Science and Medicine
 Jennifer Berman, pioneer in the field of female urology and female sexual medicine, 1986
 Mary E. Hatten, Frederick P. Rose Professor and head of Laboratory of Developmental Neurobiology, Rockefeller University, 1971

Sports
 Carol Semple Thompson, amateur golf champion, elected to the World Golf Hall of Fame, 1970
 Charlotte Fox, first woman to have climbed three of the world’s 8,000-meter peaks, 1979

References

Hollins University people
Hollins University